Shahe Univ. Park station is a station on the Changping Line of the Beijing Subway.

Station Layout 
The station has an elevated island platform.

Exits 
There are 4 exits, lettered A1, A2, B1, and B2. Exits A1 and B2 are accessible.

References

External links

Beijing Subway stations in Changping District
Railway stations in China opened in 2010
Railway stations in China at university and college campuses